The Cinder Path is a three part 1994 tv series produced by Yorkshire/Tyne Tees and directed by Simon Langton and based on the novel of the same name by Catherine Cookson.

Plot introduction
In the English countryside of the early 20th century, the prosperous, middle class farmer's son Charlie MacFell must deal with a cruel and tyrannical father and later with a romantic tangle and a problematic marriage.  He must keep, as well, a dark secret which must stay hidden at all costs.

Later, he is taken into the British Army fighting on the Western Front of the First World War, where the shadows of his past pursue him and lead to a climax.

Film 
 Screenplay: Alan Seymour
 Music: Barrington Pheloung
 Executive Producers: Ray Townsend & Keith Richardson
 Producer: Ray Marshall 
 Director: Simon Langton

Cast
 Lloyd Owen – as Charlie MacFell
 Catherine Zeta-Jones – as Victoria Chapman
Polly Adams - as Florence Chapman
Ralph Ineson - as Arthur Benton
 Tom Bell - as Edward MacFell
 Maria Miles - as Nellie Chapman
 Anthony Byrne - as Ginger Slater
Rosalind Ayres - as Mary MacFell
 Victoria Scarborough - as Betty MacFell
Lucy Akhurst - as Polly Benton

External links

Western Front (World War I) films
1994 British television series debuts
1994 British television series endings
1990s British drama television series
ITV television dramas
1990s British television miniseries
World War I television series
Television shows based on British novels
Television shows set in County Durham	
Television shows set in Northumberland
Television series by ITV Studios
Television shows produced by Tyne Tees Television
English-language television shows
Films directed by Simon Langton